The 1924 LFF Lyga was the 3rd season of the LFF Lyga football competition in Lithuania.  It was contested by 10 teams, and Kovas Kaunas won the championship.

Kaunas Group

Klaipėda Group

Final
Kovas Kaunas 2-1 Sportverein Klaipėda

References
RSSSF

LFF Lyga seasons
Lith
Lith
1924 in Lithuanian football